Yaguarón is a city in Paraguay, located at the base of Yaguarón Hill in the Yaguarón District of Paraguarí Department,  from the capital Asunción. The town began as a Franciscan reservation for the Guaraní Indians.

It contains a famous and visually stunning church, the building of which, led by Fray Alonso de Buenaventura, started in 1640 and took 60 years to complete.

Yaguarón is also notable as the birthplace of José Gaspar Rodríguez de Francia, dictator of Paraguay 1814–1840, whose strong authoritarianism earned him the name El Supremo. His house is now a museum – located only 200 or so meters from the church.

Toponymy
In the beginning the city was called Jaguarú, which means in Guaraní mythology an enormous dog or jaguar that inhabited the region.

History
Located in the foot of a hill with the same name, the city started as a Franciscan Mission with the Guaraní population.

In 1600, Fray Alonso de Buenaventura and his followers built an imposing church that still stands nowadays and is one of the most beautiful examples of Franciscan construction in Paraguay.

The Paraguayan dictator José Gaspar Rodríguez de Francia was born in Yaguarón in 1766.

Climate

Demographics
It has a total of 27,250 inhabitants, 13,965 men and 13,286 women, according to information provided by the Statistics, Polls and Census General Direction.

Economy
The economical activities of its population are agriculture, production of clothes and sports gear.

Transportation
Located 48 kilometers from Asunción, capital of the country, the access to the city is through Route No. 1 “Mcal. Francisco Solano López”.

Tourism
The Gaspar Rodríguez de Francia Museum is located just a block away from the church. In there are a variety of belongings of Francia and other objects from the 19th century.

The cavern of Saint Thomas is the place of a legend. This legend narrates that in the area, lived a priest, Pa’i Sumé, who is said left marks in his trip through the region. The road that leads to the cavern was venerated by the natives of the area, who told stories of a blond man that came much before the Spanish arrived and showed them how to cultivate the corn.

The Franciscan settled in Yaguarón and in the altar of the church they built can be appreciated the Hispanic-Guaraní style of the carvings the natives made by hand.

From the Gamarra Oratory, on top of the Yaguarón Hill, the cities Pirayú, Itá, Paraguarí and Carapeguá can be well appreciated.

The festivity of Saint Roque on August 16 is celebrated in a chapel built in his honor. Because it is said that this saint is the protector of dogs, in the celebration, people make very particular offerings with the shape of dogs.

Musical tradition
Yaguarón keeps one of the oldest musical traditions of Paraguay: The “Petete Peteke” Para’i Band, from Guayaibity Town, which uses the original musical instruments of the natives.

In the top of the Yaguarón Hill there is an Oratory, from where the beautiful landscape can be appreciated. The legend tells that in this hill are the footprints of Saint Thomas.

Sources 
 World Gazeteer: Paraguay – World-Gazetteer.com
 Geografía Ilustrada del Paraguay, Distribuidora Arami SRL; 2007. 
 Geografía del Paraguay, Primera Edición 1999, Editorial Hispana Paraguay SRL

External links

Secretaria Nacional de Turismo
Dirección General de Encuestas, Estadísticas y Censos

Yaguarón District